The following list includes notable people who were born or have lived in Lake Forest, Illinois. For a similar list organized alphabetically by last name, see the category page People from Lake Forest, Illinois.

Arts 

Sarah Brackett, actress
 Peach Carr, fashion designer; contestant on season 8 of Project Runway
 Wallace Leroy DeWolf, etcher, painter, art collector, and businessman
 Sylvia Shaw Judson, sculptor and teacher; winner of the Logan Prize in 1929 for her sculpture Little Gardener
 Lisel Mueller, poet; winner of the 1997 Pulitzer Prize for poetry
 Rene Romero Schuler, fine arts painter

Architecture 

 Edward H. Bennett, architect and city planner
 Howard Van Doren Shaw, architect; lived in Ragdale

Business

 Andrew Watson Armour III, meatpacking magnate
 J. Ogden Armour, meatpacking magnate (Armour and Company)
 Albert Blake Dick, founder of A.B. Dick Company; licensed autographic printing patents from Thomas Edison; mayor of Lake Forest (1928–1931)
 Grace Durand, businesswoman and owner of Crab Tree Dairy Farm
 W. James Farrell, chairman and CEO of Illinois Tool Works
 Charles B. and John V. Farwell, builders of the Texas State capitol building and founders of the XIT Ranch.
 Marshall Field, owner of Marshall Field's (now Macy's)
 Albert Lasker, businessman who played a major role in shaping modern advertising
 Marcus Lemonis, Chairman & CEO Camping World, host of The Profit
 Cyrus H. McCormick, inventor; founder of the McCormick Harvesting Machine Company, which later became International Harvester
 Peter W. Smith, investment banker  
 Elizabeth and Richard Uihlein, business people, founders of Uline, conservative donor, and heir

Media and writing

Acting 

 Kipleigh Brown, actress
 Kristin Cavallari, actress
 Kyle Chandler, actor
 Jay Chandrasekhar, actor, director
 Charlie Finn, actor
 Jean Harlow, actress
 Lauren Holly, actress
 John Mahoney, actor
 Mr. T, actor, wrestler
 Vince Vaughn, actor
 Richard Widmark, actor
 Robin Williams, actor, comedian
 Kathryn Joosten, actress

Directing and production 

 James T. Aubrey, Jr., television and film executive
 John Hughes, writer, director, producer
 Alex Timbers, theater writer and director

Journalism 

 Mary Maher, journalist, trade unionist and feminist
 Bill Schulz, journalist (Fox News)
 Sam Weller, author and journalist

Music 

 Bix Beiderbecke, jazz cornet player and pianist
 Andrew Bird, musician and songwriter
 Mat Devine, lead singer of Chicago-based alternative rock band Kill Hannah

Writing 

 Lacy Crawford, writer
 Dave Eggers, writer
 Jen Lancaster, writer
 Arthur Meeker Jr., novelist

Politics and law 

 Joseph E. Anderson (1873−1937), Illinois state legislator and most recent Prohibitionist member of the Illinois General Assembly.
 David N. Barkhausen, Illinois state legislator and politician
 Mary Beattie, Illinois state legislator
 Edward J. Brundage, Illinois Attorney General
 Fredrik Herman Gade, mayor of Lake Forest; diplomat from Norway
Charles B. Farwell, United States Senator from Illinois (1887-1891) and member of the United States House of Representatives (1871-1876, 1881-1883), cofounder of the Onwentsia Club, owner of XIT Ranch
 Susan Garrett, Illinois Senate state senator representing the 29th District
 Noble Brandon Judah, United States Ambassador to Cuba (1927–1929)
 Robert P. Lamont, United States Secretary of Commerce (1929–1932)
 William Mather Lewis, mayor of Lake Forest (1915–1917); president of George Washington and Lafayette Universities
 Thomas J. Moran, Chief Justice of the Illinois Supreme Court
 William Proxmire, U.S. Senator from Wisconsin
 Judy Baar Topinka, Illinois Comptroller and Illinois State Treasurer
 Pete Wilson, 36th Governor of California (1991–1999); United States Senator (1983–1991); 29th Mayor of San Diego (1971–1983)
 Corrine Wood, 44th lieutenant governor of Illinois

Sciences 

 Pamela Darling, library preservation specialist
 Jim Lovell, astronaut on Gemini 7, Gemini 12, Apollo 8, and Apollo 13; author of Lost Moon; owner of Lovell's of Lake Forest
 Karl Patterson Schmidt, herpetologist

Socialites and modeling 

 Margaret "Peg" Carry, socialite; daughter of Pullman Company president Edward F. Carry; friend of F. Scott Fitzgerald
Rose Farwell Chatfield-Taylor, socialite, sportswoman, bookbinder, suffragist, cofounder of Onwentsia Club
 Ginevra King, socialite; inspiration for many female characters in F. Scott Fitzgerald's work, including Daisy Buchanan in The Great Gatsby
 Edith Rockefeller McCormick, socialite
 Prince Rostislav Rostislavovich, descendant of the Russian Imperial dynasty the House of Romanov
 McKey Sullivan, fashion model and winner of America's Next Top Model, Cycle 11

Sports

Baseball 

 Mickey Cochrane, catcher for Philadelphia Athletics and Detroit Tigers in Baseball Hall of Fame
 Joe Girardi, catcher for the Chicago Cubs, manager of the New York Yankees
 Mabel Holle (1920–2011), third basewoman and outfielder in All-American Girls Professional Baseball League
 Scott Sanderson, All-Star pitcher for eight MLB teams
 Steve Stanicek, designated hitter for Milwaukee Brewers and Philadelphia Phillies

Basketball 

 Bill Cartwright, center and coach for the Chicago Bulls 
 Kevin Edwards, shooting guard for the Miami Heat and New Jersey Nets 
 Steve Kerr, point guard for the Chicago Bulls 
 Scottie Pippen, forward for the Chicago Bulls

Driving 

 Carl Haas, auto racing impresario
 Horst Kwech, champion Trans Am Series driver and race car constructor
 Steve Seligman, stock car racer

Football 

 Gabe Carimi (born 1988 in Lake Forest), offensive lineman for the Chicago Bears
 Jim Covert, offensive lineman for the Chicago Bears
 Jay Cutler, quarterback for the Chicago Bears
 Bobby Douglass, quarterback for the Chicago Bears
 George Halas, head coach of the Chicago Bears
 Cade McNown, quarterback for the Chicago Bears
 Robert Quinn, linebacker for the Chicago Bears 
 Lovie Smith, head coach for the Chicago Bears
 Kevin Walter, former wide receiver in the NFL
 Tom Waddle, wide receiver for the Chicago Bears
 James O. Williams,"Big Cat", tackle for Chicago Bears and offensive lineman coach for Lake Forest High School

Golf 

 Chip Beck, PGA Tour golfer
 Edith Cummings, golfer; US Women's Amateur Champion (1924)

Gymnastics 

 Nicole Sladkov, Olympic rhythmic gymnast

Hockey 

 Keith Magnuson, defenseman for the Chicago Blackhawks, team captain

Swimming 

 Matt Grevers, Olympic swimmer; silver medalist (2008), gold medalist (2012)

Sports journalism 

 Tim Weigel, sports anchor and reporter
 Sarah Spain, radio host and sports reporter, ESPN

References

Lake Forest
Lake Forest